Diodora crucifera is a species of sea snail, a marine gastropod mollusk in the family Fissurellidae, the keyhole limpets.

Description
The size of the shell varies between 10 mm and 20 mm.

Distribution
This marine species occurs in the Indian Ocean off Port Alfred, South Africa to Mozambique and in the Mascarene Basin.

References

 Drivas, J. & M. Jay (1988). Coquillages de La Réunion et de l'île Maurice 
 Christiaens, J. 1980. The limpets of Hong Kong with descriptions of seven new species and subspecies. pp. 61–84 in B. Morton (ed.), Proceedings of the First International Workshop on the Malacofauna of Hong Kong and Southern China. page(s): 62
 Steyn, D.G. & Lussi, M. (1998) Marine Shells of South Africa. An Illustrated Collector’s Guide to Beached Shells. Ekogilde Publishers, Hartebeespoort, South Africa, ii + 264 pp. page(s): 10

External links

Fissurellidae
Gastropods described in 1890